Duncan Kennedy may refer to:

 Duncan Kennedy (legal philosopher) (born 1942), legal philosopher at Harvard Law School
 Duncan Kennedy (luger) (born 1967), American luger
 D. James Kennedy (1930–2007), American Christian broadcaster and church pastor